Brothers is a 2016 Chinese war action drama film directed by Ah Gan. It was released in China by China Film Group Corporation and Zhejiang Tianmao Technology on May 20, 2016.

Plot
The film centers on the relationship between two brothers who used to have a bond for life but it is ripped apart through a civil war in 1936.

Cast
Peter Ho
Ethan Li
Xia Zitong
Yang Qiming
Tian Yuan
He Lanpeng
Song Ning
Wang Wang
Huang Tianyuan

Reception
The film has grossed  at the Chinese box office.

References

Chinese war drama films
2010s war drama films
2016 action drama films
China Film Group Corporation films
Films set in 1936
2010s Mandarin-language films